William Dickson Wilson (7 September 1900 – 24 June 1973) was a Scottish footballer who played as a goalkeeper for Peebles Rovers and Dunfermline Athletic in the Scottish Football League and for Newcastle United and Millwall in the English Football League.

He became the regular Newcastle goalkeeper immediately after joining the Magpies in 1925 and won the league title in the 1926–27 season, in which he was ever-present (42 matches, part of a sequence of 120 consecutive appearances). He lost his place to Mick Burns at the end of 1928 and moved on to second-tier Millwall where he spent five years, departing when the Lions were relegated following the 1933–34 season.

References

Scottish footballers
Footballers from East Lothian
1900 births
1973 deaths
Newcastle United F.C. players
English Football League players
Scottish Football League players
Scottish Junior Football Association players
Millwall F.C. players
Peebles Rovers F.C. players
Musselburgh Athletic F.C. players
Dunfermline Athletic F.C. players
Association football goalkeepers